Jaung-Geng Lin is a professor.

Career
He is a Chair Professor at the China Medical University, Taiwan.

In 2022 he was elected to the Academia Sinica.

References

Academic staff of China Medical University (Taiwan)
Members of Academia Sinica